The Silent Enemy is a 1958 British action film directed by William Fairchild. It stars Laurence Harvey as Lionel "Buster" Crabb and describes his exploits during World War II. Based on Marshall Pugh's book Commander Crabb, the film followed the publicity created by Crabb's mysterious disappearance and likely death during a Cold War incident a year earlier. It was the first Universal Pictures film in SuperScope.

The film depicts events in Gibraltar harbour during the World War II Italian frogman and manned torpedo attacks, although the film's depiction of the events is highly fictionalised.

Plot
The British are worried that this new tactic will afford the Italians naval supremacy in the Mediterranean and the ability to strike their primary target, the Royal Navy base at Gibraltar. To counter this threat, bomb-disposal expert Lionel Crabb is posted to Gibraltar. He organises a small team of divers to intercept the Italian attacks and defuse the bombs. Meanwhile, from Algeciras in neutral Spain, Italian expert on underwater operations Antonio Tomolino is secretly watching the British base in Gibraltar and planning new attacks.

After the Italians mount a failed attack upon a cruiser in Gibraltar, Crabb and his divers recover one of the manned torpedoes and begin to repair it. Petty officer Thorpe takes command of physical and diving training.

After a further series of attacks against ships in Gibraltar harbour and an attempt to recover secret documents from a wrecked aircraft, Crabb visits Algeciras to discover the Italians' base of operations. After following a man with an Italian tattoo to the interned Italian ship the Olterra, he discovers that the ship's hold is being used as a workshop and base for the operations. The ship's underwater door is used for the manned torpedoes and by frogmen, which leaves them undiscovered by Spanish authorities. Crabb reports the discovery of the Olterra to his superiors, but under the laws of neutrality, he cannot arrange an attack without top-level authority.

Meanwhile, the Italians plan a major attack on a British convoy. Crabb ignores orders and, with the manned torpedo repaired, he and another diver infiltrate the docks at Algeciras, launching a preemptive strike on the Olterra that destroys the ship, workshop and crew.

The next morning, with the convoy leaving Gibraltar, Thorpe informs Crabb that for his bravery in this operation he has been awarded the George Medal, commenting to his men: "You all deserve the ruddy medal!"

Cast

 Laurence Harvey as Lieutenant Lionel Crabb, R.N.V.R. 
 Dawn Addams as Third Officer Jill Masters, W.R.N.S. 
 Michael Craig as Leading Seaman Knowles 
 John Clements as the Admiral 
 Sid James as Chief Petty Officer Thorpe 
 Alec McCowen as Able Seaman Morgan 
 Nigel Stock as Able Seaman Fraser 
 Ian Whittaker as Ordinary Seaman Thomas 
 Arnoldo Foà as Tomolino 
 Gianna Maria Canale as Conchita 
 Massimo Serato as Forzellini 
 Giacomo Rossi-Stuart as Rosati 
 Carlo Giustini as Fellini 
 Raymond Young as Celloni 
 David Lodge as Sergeant 
 Ewen Solon as Willowdale Captain 
 Brian Oulton as Holford 
 Howard Marion-Crawford as Wing Commander
 Cyril Shaps as Miguel 
 Lee Montague as Miguel's Mate 
 John Lee as Flag Lieutenant 
 Terence Longdon as Lieutenant Bailey
 Ian MacNaughton as Sentry outside Admiral's Office 
 
 
 David Fotheringham as Italian frogman
 Alan Webb as British Consul 
 John Moffatt as Diving Volunteer 
 Harold Siddons as Army Interrogation Officer 
 Derren Nesbitt as Patrol Boat Officer
 Michael Brill as Naval Interrogation Officer

Production
The film was announced in June 1957. Filming took place in England, Malta and Gibraltar.

Harvey was injured in the leg and hospitalised during filming in Malta.

Michael Craig had been suspended by the Rank Organisation for refusing the lead in The Gentleman and the Gypsy but was removed from the project after James Woolf of Romulus Films offered Craig's annual salary to Rank. Craig said that Laurence Harvey "was good company, generous to his friends and, in spite of his reputation as a user, I liked him a lot."

Historical inaccuracies 
The British divers are shown as using Davis Submerged Escape Apparatus, with the Italians using the British Chariot manned torpedoes rather than Italian Maiale manned torpedoes.

In reality, Crabb spent several months deactivating mines brought ashore by other divers before learning to dive himself.

The real divers did not initially wear fins. Crabb and Knowles were the first to use them after removing them from the Italian chariot divers.

See also
Films featuring human torpedoes

References

External links

1958 films
1950s English-language films
British World War II films
Underwater action films
Films shot at Elstree Studios
Films shot in Gibraltar
Gibraltar in World War II
Royal Navy in World War II films
Films set in the Mediterranean Sea
Films scored by William Alwyn
Films set in Gibraltar
Films directed by William Fairchild
1950s British films